Mothership HackerMoms is a nonprofit hackerspace/makerspace in Berkeley, California, founded in 2011. It was the first all-women hackerspace.,

The 1000-square-foot space provides space for members to work on projects and hold events while their children are onsite with child care. They have participated in DIY culture events such as Maker Faire, Bizarre Bazaar, and Oakland Art Murmur, and have access to another San Francisco Bay Area hackerspace, Ace Monster Toys. The members define Mothership HackerMoms as a hackerspace deliberately to include themselves in the open source and free culture movements. Members have held workshops on how to use Drupal and Illustrator, how to lay a resin coating on a canvas, done painting, drawing, photography, and made linoprints.

See also 

 Double Union
 Noisebridge

References

External links 
 

Culture of San Francisco
DIY culture
Hackerspaces
Hackerspaces in the San Francisco Bay Area
Non-profit organizations based in San Francisco
2011 establishments in California
Women in California